Justin Marks is an American screenwriter, producer and television showrunner. He is best known for writing Disney's live-action remake of The Jungle Book and for creating and showrunning the Starz espionage thriller Counterpart.

Education 
Marks graduated from Columbia College of Columbia University in 2002 and he studied architecture in college. During his senior year, he befriended a literary manager, who helped him launch his career in screenwriting.

Career 
One of the first scripts he penned was Street Fighter: The Legend of Chun Li for 20th Century Fox. 

A year prior, he had written a script for a potential He-Man film. Initially entitled Grayskull: The Masters of The Universe, the script was praised by fans yet was never used since the script was rewritten. With the film still being in development hell.

After a pilot produced for SyFy failed to sell, Marks wrote of his experiences for the Hollywood Reporter.  

In July 2013, Marks was hired by Disney to write a live-action adaptation of The Jungle Book. Jon Favreau came on board as director, and the film was released in April 2016, grossing $966 million worldwide.

In June 2015, it was revealed that Marks was working on the screenplay for a sequel to the 1986 film Top Gun. The film, titled Top Gun: Maverick, was released in theatres between May 24 and May 27, 2022, with Marks credited with co-writing the film's story with Peter Craig.

In 2016, Marks was working on a Jungle Book sequel with Favreau returning as director.

Marks created the Starz science-fiction thriller Counterpart, starring J. K. Simmons. The show was ordered straight-to-series for two 10-episode seasons. The first episode premiered December 10, 2017 but the series failed to attract an audience often averaging less than half a million viewers.  Marks stated on his Twitter feed that MRC would attempt to find the series a new home.  Starz cited a lack of female appeal. 

In 2020, Marks and his wife Rachel Kondo started working on the upcoming TV adaptation of Shogun, the novel by James Clavell.  At the time FX's intentions were reported: "To counter this lack of Japanese representation on staff, the series will use consultants to weigh in on the Asian perspective.”

Filmography

Film

Television

References

External links 
 
 

Place of birth missing (living people)
Year of birth missing (living people)
21st-century American male writers
21st-century American screenwriters
American male screenwriters
American television producers
American television writers
Showrunners
Living people
Columbia College (New York) alumni